Sideritis candicans (erva branca, selvageira). More or less white to greyish, densely tomentose shrub 45–100 cm. Leaves 2.5-12 x 1.5 x 7.5 cm, the lower ovate-lanceolate to ovate, acute to obtuse, rounded to cordate at base, weakly crenate to sub-entire, petiolate. Inflorescence up to 30 cm. Calyx 5–6.5 mm; teeth 1–1.5 mm. Corolla creamy yellow; tube 4–5.5 mm not exserted; upper lip 23–2.5 mm; lower lip 2.2-3.5 mm, the middle lobe shallowly notched. Nutlets 1.5 mm, ovoid. Flowers from Mars to July. Widespread in clearings and open sunny places mostly from 600 to 1700 m. Endemic to the islands of Madeira, Porto Santo and Bugio.

References

 Press, J. R. and M. J. Short. Flora of Madeira. Natural History Museum, UK. 1994. .
 Flora Endémica da Madeira, Roberto Jardim, David Francisco, Múchia, Publicações, 1ªed, 2000, Portugal,

External links
 http://botany.cz/cs/sideritis-candicans/
 http://calphotos.berkeley.edu/cgi/img_query?enlarge=0000+0000+0610+0215
 

candicans
Flora of Madeira
Endemic flora of Madeira
Endemic flora of Macaronesia
Plants described in 1789